Kapik (also Romanized as Kāpīk) is a village in Shenetal Rural District, Kuhsar District, Salmas County, West Azerbaijan Province, Iran. At the 2006 census, its population was 592, in 110 families.

References 

Populated places in Salmas County